Jeongseon-eup is a town in Jeongseon County, Gangwon Province, South Korea. It is famous for the three day "Jeongseon Arirang Festival," held every fall. Jeongseon is also famous for its 5 Day Market (5일장) which offers up a variety of traditional Korean herbs, vegetables, and traditional medicines.

The city is also home to Jeongseon Stadium which hosts WK-League soccer matches weekly starting Summer of 2012.

See also 
 List of cities in South Korea

References

External links
Jeongseon Town Office website 

Towns and townships in Gangwon Province, South Korea
Jeongseon County